Suneel Saraf is an Indian politician. He is a member of Madhya Pradesh legislative assembly. He was elected as MLA from Kotma Assembly constituency.

References

People from Anuppur district
1974 births
Madhya Pradesh MLAs 2018–2023
Indian National Congress politicians from Madhya Pradesh
Living people